Ravindra Nagar is a neighborhood situated on the northern part of Visakhapatnam City, India. The area, which falls under the local administrative limits of Greater Visakhapatnam Municipal Corporation, is about 7 km from the Dwaraka Nagar which is city centre. Ravindra Nagar is located Near to Arilova and surrounded by Kambalakonda Wildlife Sanctuary. its well connected with One Town

Transport
APSRTC routes

References

Neighbourhoods in Visakhapatnam